Sigmodal (Rectidon) is a barbiturate derivative. It has sedative, hypnotic and anticonvulsant properties, and was used in surgical anaesthesia in the 1950s, and frequently appeared in drug mixtures in the 60s.

It was never widely used compared to better known barbiturates such as thiopental, and has now been replaced by newer drugs with a better safety profile.

References 

Barbiturates
Sedatives
Organobromides
GABAA receptor positive allosteric modulators